Thomas David Parry was a Welsh international footballer.

His brother Maurice was also a footballer, and they represented Wales together on four occasions. His nephew Frank, was also a professional footballer and made over 100 appearances in the Football League.

References

Year of birth missing
Year of death missing
Welsh footballers
Wales international footballers
Oswestry Town F.C. players
Association footballers not categorized by position